The men's 4×200 metre freestyle relay was a swimming event held as part of the swimming at the 1928 Summer Olympics programme. It was the fifth appearance of the event, which was established in 1908. The competition was held on Saturday 11 August 1928.

Fifty-five swimmers from 13 nations competed.

Note: The International Olympic Committee medal database shows only these four swimmers from the United States as gold medalist. Paul Samson and David Young both swam in the semi-final are not credited with medals. Also the Japanese Kazuo Noda who swam in the semi-final is not listed as silver medalist.

Records
These were the standing world and Olympic records (in minutes) prior to the 1928 Summer Olympics.

The United States with Paul Samson, Austin Clapp, David Young, and Johnny Weissmuller set a new world record in the semi-final with 9:38.8 minutes. In the final the United States with Austin Clapp, Walter Laufer, George Kojac, and Johnny Weissmuller bettered the world record to 9:36.2 minutes.

Results

Semifinals

The fastest two in each semi-final and the fastest third-placed from across the semi-finals advanced to the final.

Semifinal 1

Semifinal 2

Semifinal 3

Final

References

External links
Olympic Report
 

Swimming at the 1928 Summer Olympics
4 × 200 metre freestyle relay
Men's events at the 1928 Summer Olympics